MV Ulster Prince was a passenger ferry operated across the Irish Sea between 1929 and 1940. She became a total loss in Greece while a troop ship during WWII.

History
Ulster Prince was the last of  three 3700ton motorships built by Harland and Wolff for the Belfast Steamship Co. between 1929 and 1930. The trio provided a reliable and regular overnight service between Liverpool and Belfast, which was marketed as the Ulster Imperial Line. Their original grey hulls were later changed to black.

Ulster Prince was used as a troop ship during WWII, and became H. M. T. Ulster Prince. In 1940, she landed troops in Iceland for the occupation of Iceland. In April 1941, during the evacuation of Greece, she ran aground off Nafplio, Greece. The following day, she was bombed and became a total loss.

After the war, she was replaced on the Liverpool - Belfast service by the British and Irish ferry  (renamed Ulster Prince (2)).

Service
Liverpool - Belfast (1930 - 1940)
wartime troop ship (1940–41)

References

Ferries of the United Kingdom
1929 ships
Ships built by Harland and Wolff
Troop ships of the United Kingdom